St. Werburgh's is an area in north-east central Bristol, England. It is surrounded by the M32 motorway.

Geology 
The solid geology of St Werburghs comprises Triassic Redcliffe Sandstone to the south-east of Glenfrome Road, and Triassic mudstone and halite-stone of the Mercia Mudstone Group to the north. The solid geology in the Mina Road Park area and in the valleys of the River Frome and Horfield Brook is overlain by superficial deposits of Quaternary alluvium.

History 
Before 1879 the northern part of the area now known as St. Werburghs was referred to as Ashley Vale, and the southern part Baptist Mills. The area became known as St. Werburghs in 1879 when St Werburgh's Church was relocated (with substantial rebuilding) to Mina Road in this district from Corn Street, Bristol. The church is now a climbing centre run by The Climbing Academy.

The area was historically prone to serious flooding from the River Frome, notably in 1882 and 1889. There are still four Victorian flood marker posts. It was also a source of water supply for the city of Bristol through the Quay Pipe and The Boiling Wells.

St. Werburghs has a city farm and has been the scene of several environmental campaigns including the development of a self-build housing community and the establishing of Narroways Hill as a Millennium Green and wildlife area.

The BBC Television series Only Fools and Horses, which was filmed in and around Bristol, used the allotments for the episode 'Mother Nature's Son', and BBC wildlife and gardening programmes and Casualty have been filmed in the area.

Area
The district is close to the district of St Pauls. Whilst it has a more of a cultural mix than Bristol, it is not as diverse as other inner city areas. It also has more family housing  which has increased house prices. The area has less crime than the other inner city Bristol areas. This leads to the benefits of a multi-cultural community but  less deprivation than some neighbouring areas.

Mina Road is St Werburghs' 'high street', whose shops each have an imaginative figurehead protruding from their frontages indicating the type of trade on offer.

The park opposite the shops contains an original example of a cast iron Victorian public lavatory.

Transport 
St Werburghs was served by the number 5 bus route and its replacement, 47 Bristol–Yate. The route is set to be withdrawn in April 2023 which will leave the area without a bus service.

See also 
 St Werburgh

References

Areas of Bristol